David Carr (born August 28, 1987) is an American politician serving as Council Member for the 50th Council District of the New York City Council. He is a Republican.

His district is located completely on Staten Island and encompasses the neighborhoods of Arrochar, Bloomfield, Bulls Head, Castleton Corners, Chelsea, Concord, Dongan Hills, Egbertville, Emerson Hill, Fort Wadsworth, Graniteville, Grant City, Grasmere, Heartland Village, Isle of Meadows, Lighthouse Hill, Manor Heights, Meiers Corners, Midland Beach, New Dorp, New Springville, Oakwood, Ocean Breeze, Old Town, Prall's Island, Richmondtown, Rosebank, Shore Acres, South Beach, Todt Hill, Travis, Westerleigh, and Willowbrook.

Life and career
David Carr was born on Staten Island and is a lifelong resident of the Grasmere section of the borough. He attended local schools including the former St. John Villa Academy and Monsignor Farrell High School. Carr went on to earn a B.A. from Georgetown University. His first senior role in local government was as Chief of Staff to then-Assemblyman Joe Borelli and later in the same position for Council Member and later New York City Council Minority Leader Steven Matteo.

Election to Council
Carr became a candidate for the 50th Council District in 2020 and sought to be the latest in a continuous line of representatives for that seat going back to its creation in 1991 when John Fusco was first elected. Since then, each new Council Member had been the Chief of Staff of his immediate predecessor. Carr was endorsed by the Staten Island Republican Party.

As one of five candidates in the primary, Carr made his campaign about public safety by calling for 6,000 new police officers to be hired over the ensuing five fiscal years and the restoration of qualified immunity to New York City Police Department officers. The contest became contentious as Carr accused an opponent, Marko Kepi, of illegal ballot harvesting including the registering of a dead person to vote and of forging signatures to get absentee ballots. This in turn led to recriminations of racism and vote manipulation. After losing a manual recount, Kepi took the matter to court where the presiding judge noted disturbing patterns in the signatures on the absentee envelopes. Ultimately, Carr prevailed in all court challenges, sustaining his win of the GOP nomination.

In the general election, Carr defeated Sal Albanese (Democrat) and George Wonica (Conservative). He was sworn in early to take over the for the unexpired term of Matteo after the latter left to lead a Staten Island not-for-profit. Carr became the only openly gay elected representative for Staten Island and the first openly gay Republican on the City Council.

Electoral history

References

1987 births
Living people
Candidates in the 2021 United States elections
Gay politicians
American LGBT city council members
LGBT people from New York (state)
New York City Council members
New York (state) Republicans
Politicians from Staten Island
21st-century American politicians
21st-century American LGBT people